Motu Taufarii is a  island in the Bora Bora Islands Group, within the Society Islands of French Polynesia. It is the located between Tupe, and Tofari.

The island has some private households.

The nearest airport is Bora Bora Airport.

Administration
The island is part of Bora Bora Commune.

References